Sean Whalen (born May 19, 1964) is an American actor and writer. He is known for his work in numerous TV shows, including Shannon's Deal and Grace Under Fire, as well as movies, including The People Under the Stairs and Twister. He is also known for appearing as a hapless history buff in the first "Got Milk?" commercial, directed by Michael Bay, which aired in 1993.

Select filmography

Film 

 The People Under the Stairs (1991, as Roach)
 Batman Returns (1992, as Paperboy)
 Revenge of the Nerds III: The Next Generation (1992, as Wormser)
 Stepmonster (1993, as the Comic Cashier)
 Doppelganger (1993, as the Gas Man)
 Tammy and the T-Rex (1994, as Weasel)
 Jury Duty (1995, as Carl Wayne Bishop)
 Twister (1996, as Allan Sanders)
 That Thing You Do! (1996, as a fan)
 Never Been Kissed (1999, as Merkin)
 Idle Hands (1999, as McMacy)
 The Hebrew Hammer (2003, as Tiny Tim)
 Employee of the Month (2006, as Dirk)
 Laid to Rest-Steven
 Halloween II (2009, as Becks)
 The FP (2011, as Stacy's dad)
 Hatchet III (2013, as Randy)
 Jersey Boys (2014, Engineer)
 Blood Brothers (also known as The Divine Tragedies, 2015, as Doug)
 The Axe Murders of Villisca (2016, as Reverend Kelly)
 Death House (2017, as Satan)
 Ugly Sweater Party (2018, as Declan Raines)
 FP2: Beats of Rage (2018, as Stanya)
 3 from Hell (2019, as Burt Willie)
 Ice Cream in the Cupboard (2019, as Doug Hannigan)
 An American Pickle (2020, as Scientist)

Television
 The Amazing Live Sea Monkeys (1992)
 Friends (1994, Pizza Guy, “The One With George Stephanopoulos" 
 Lois & Clark: The New Adventures of Superman (1995, as Skipy)
 Just Shoot Me! (1999, Maury, "Blackmail Photographer")
 Special Unit 2 (2001, 6 episodes, as Sean Radmon)
 My Wife and Kids (2003–2004, 3 episodes as Larry)
 Unfabulous (2004–2007, 14 episodes, as Coach Pearson)
 The Suite Life of Zack & Cody (2006, "What the Hey", as Wacky Wally)
 Wizards of Waverly Place (2009, 'Halloween' as Mantooth)
 Lost (2009–2010, 4 episodes, as Neil 'Frogurt')
 The Bold and the Beautiful (2007–2011, 34 episodes, as Carl Ferret)
 Days of Our Lives (2014, 3 episodes, as Ted)
 Bunk'd (2017, "The Great Escape" as Cosmo)
 Superstore (2015–2016, 4 episodes, as Sal Kazlauskas)
 Scrubs (2003, "My Own American Girl", as Laddy)

References

External links 
  (dead, archived November 2018)
 

Living people
American male television actors
American writers
1964 births
Male actors from Washington, D.C.
American male film actors
George School alumni